= Enzo Alfatahi =

French footballer (born 2003)

Personal information
- Date of birth: 9 July 2003 (age 23)
- Place of birth: France
- Height: 1.75 m (5 ft 9 in)
- Position: Leftback

Team information
- Current team: Troyes II

Senior career*
Years	Team	Apps	(Gls)
2020–	Troyes II	2	(0)
2020–2021	Troyes	0	(0)
- * Club domestic league appearances and goals as of 25 January 2021

Enzo Alfatahi (born 9 July 2003) is a French professional footballer who plays as a left-back for Troyes II.

== Career ==
Alfatahi made his professional debut with Troyes in a 1–0 Coupe de France loss to AJ Auxerre on 19 January 2021.

== Personal life ==
Born in France, Alfatahi holds French and Moroccan nationalities.
